Wishbone commonly refers to:

 Furcula, a fork-shaped bone in birds and some dinosaurs

Wishbone may also refer to:

 Wish-Bone, an American salad dressing and condiment company
 Wishbone formation, a type of offense in American football
 Wishbone (computer bus), an open source hardware computer bus
 Wishbone boom, for control of sail on a windsurfing board
 Wishbone, a submission hold and double-team attack in pro wrestling
 Double wishbone suspension, an automotive design feature

Popular culture 
 Wishbone (TV series), an American children's program
 The Wishbone, a 1933 British comedy film
 Wish Bone (born 1974), American rapper
 Wish Bone (album), by Oh Land
 Wishbones, an album by David Knopfler
 "Wishbone", a song by Freya Ridings from You Mean the World to Me
 "Wishbone", a song by Dropbox from the album Dropbox
 G.W. Wishbone, a fictional character in the TV series Rawhide